is a former Japanese football player.

Playing career
Fujiyama was born in Kagoshima on June 9, 1973. After graduating from high school, he joined Japan Football League club Tokyo Gas (later FC Tokyo) in 1992. He became a regular player as side midfielder and defensive midfielder from first season. In the middle of 1995, he was converted to left side back by manager Kiyoshi Okuma and played many matches as left side back for a long time. The club results also rose year by year and won the champions in 1998 and was promoted to new league J2 League from 1999. In 1999, the club won the 2nd place and was promoted to J1 League from 2000. Although he operated on his right ankle end of 2001 season and his opportunity to play decreased from 2002, he also played many matches as center back not only side back. In 2004, the club won the champions J.League Cup first major title in the club history. At the Final against Urawa Reds, he played as center back from the 33rd minute, because Jean received a red card and he sealed off Urawa's attack. Although he became a regular player as center back again, his opportunity to play decreased from 2008. In 2010, he moved to J2 club Consadole Sapporo. He played as regular player as center back and right side back and retired end of 2010 season.

Club statistics

References

External links

1973 births
Living people
Association football people from Kagoshima Prefecture
Japanese footballers
J1 League players
J2 League players
Japan Football League (1992–1998) players
FC Tokyo players
Hokkaido Consadole Sapporo players
Association football defenders
People from Kagoshima